George Khoury (born in 1970) is the current eparch of the Eparchy of Our Lady of the Paradise in São Paulo of Greek Melkites.

Biography

George Khoury was born in Tartus, Syria, on 14 February 1970. In 1998 he was ordained deacon and on 14 April 1999 Khoury was ordained to the priesthood.

On 17 June 2019 he was named eparch to the Eparchy of Our Lady of the Paradise in São Paulo.

References

External links
 http://www.catholic-hierarchy.org/bishop/bkhouryg.html

1970 births
Living people
Melkite Greek Catholic bishops
Syrian Melkite Greek Catholics
People from Tartus Governorate